In quantum mechanics, the Pauli equation or Schrödinger–Pauli equation is the formulation of the Schrödinger equation for spin-½ particles, which takes into account the interaction of the particle's spin with an external electromagnetic field. It is the non-relativistic limit of the Dirac equation and can be used where particles are moving at speeds much less than the speed of light, so that relativistic effects can be neglected. It was formulated by Wolfgang Pauli in 1927.

Equation 

For a particle of mass  and electric charge , in an electromagnetic field described by the magnetic vector potential  and the electric scalar potential , the Pauli equation reads:

The state of the system,  (written in Dirac notation), can be considered as a two-component spinor wavefunction, or a column vector (after choice of basis):
.

The Hamiltonian operator is a 2 × 2 matrix because of the Pauli operators.

Substitution into the Schrödinger equation gives the Pauli equation. This Hamiltonian is similar to the classical Hamiltonian for a charged particle interacting with an electromagnetic field. See Lorentz force for details of this classical case.

The Pauli operators can be removed from the kinetic energy term using the Pauli vector identity:

Note that unlike a vector, the differential operator  has non-zero cross product with itself.  This can be seen by considering the cross product applied to a scalar function :

where  is the magnetic field.

For the full Pauli equation, one then obtains

Weak magnetic fields 
For the case of where the magnetic field is constant and homogenous, one may expand   using the symmetric gauge , where  is the position operator and A is now an operator. We obtain

where  is the particle angular momentum operator and we neglected terms in the magnetic field squared . Therefore we obtain

where   is the spin of the particle. The factor 2 in front of the spin is known as the Dirac g-factor.

For an electron of charge  in an isotropic constant magnetic field, one can further reduce the equation using the total angular momentum  and Wigner-Eckart theorem. Thus we find

The term  is known as the Landé g-factor, and is given here by

From Dirac equation 

The Pauli equation is the non-relativistic limit of Dirac equation, the relativistic quantum equation of motion for particles spin-½.

Derivation 
Dirac equation can be written as:

Using the following ansatz:

with two new spinors , the equation becomes

In the non-relativistic limit,  and the kinetic and electrostatic energies are small with respect to the rest energy .

Thus

Inserted in the upper component of Dirac equation, we find Pauli equation (general form):

From a Foldy–Wouthuysen transformation 
One can also rigorously derive Pauli equation, starting from Dirac equation in an external field and performing a Foldy–Wouthuysen transformation.

Pauli coupling 
Pauli's equation is derived by requiring minimal coupling, which provides a g-factor g=2. Most elementary particles have anomalous g-factors, different from 2. In the domain of relativistic quantum field theory, one defines a non-minimal coupling, sometimes called Pauli coupling, in order to add an anomalous factor

In the context of non-relativistic quantum mechanics, instead of working with the Schrödinger equation, Pauli coupling is equivalent to using the Pauli equation (or postulating Zeeman energy) for an arbitrary g-factor.

See also

 Semiclassical physics
 Atomic, molecular, and optical physics
 Group contraction
Gordon decomposition

Footnotes

References

Books
 
 
 

Quantum mechanics